Río Chico Department may refer to:
Río Chico Department, Santa Cruz
Río Chico Department, Tucumán

Department name disambiguation pages